SOCEP Constanţa (Socep S.A. or Socep) (BSE: SOCP) is a port operator of the Port of Constanţa in Romania. The company was established in 1991 and specializes in stevedoring services and the development of container and steel materials. Having been fully privatized in 1996, Socep is one of the largest port operators in Romania.

Socep's activity centers around two operating terminals — a container terminal (300,000 TEU – annual operating capacity) and a general cargo terminal (3 million tons – annual operating capacity). The company's terminal in Constanţa is one of the oldest terminals and is the second largest in terms of volume of shipments.

Socep's major shareholders are Grupul DD Constanța (31.32%) and millionaire Stere Samara (10.52%).

Main services
 Containers vessel/shore operations;
 Dry bulk cargo vessel/shore operations;
 Break bulk cargo vessel/shore operations;
 Containers stuffing/stripping any cargo type;
 Containers storage area;
 Reefer containers storage points;
 Break bulk and bulk cargo storage in warehouses and open platforms;
 Refrigerated warehouse for fresh fruit storage;
 Cargo lashing;
 Sorting and labeling;
 Bulk cargo bagging;
 Dangerous goods handling/storage.

Main operated cargo
 Containers;
 Dry bulk products :
 Fertilizers
 Alumina
 Cereals
 Raw sugar
 Coke
 Sulfur
 Ores
 Scrap metal
 Break bulk products:
 Metallurgical products
 Bagged goods
 Timber products
 Paper
 Fresh fruits
 Heavy lift projects

Turnover

 2009: 45,8 million Romanian leu
 2008: 58,8 million Romanian leu
 2007: 44 million   Romanian leu
 2006: 39,1 million Romanian leu

References

External links
www.socep.ro - Official website
SOCEP Constanţa at doingbusiness.ro
SOCEP Constanţa at Maritime-Database.com

Companies listed on the Bucharest Stock Exchange
Port operating companies
Privately held companies of Romania
Shipping companies of Romania
Companies based in Constanța